Crucifer is an unincorporated community in Henderson County, Tennessee, United States.

Crucifer was originally called "Cross Plains", and under the latter name was founded ca. 1835. A post office called Crucifer was established in 1836, and remained in operation until 1904.

Notes

Unincorporated communities in Henderson County, Tennessee
Unincorporated communities in Tennessee